Sikaiana (formerly called the Stewart Islands) is a small atoll  NE of Malaita in Solomon Islands in the south Pacific Ocean. It is almost  in length and its lagoon, known as Te Moana, is totally enclosed by the coral reef. Its total land surface is only . There is no safe anchorage close to this atoll, which makes it often inaccessible to outsiders.

Geography
Sikaiana is a remote tropical coral atoll located at latitude and longitude 8°25′0″S 162°52′0″E, over 200 kilometres (125 miles) from any other islands. The main island at Sikaiana atoll, located at the easternmost corner, is called Sikaiana. The three small islands in the west of the atoll are Tehaolei (north), Matuiloto (west), and Matuavi (south). There are also two artificial islands on the reef, Te Palena and Hakatai'atata.

History
Administratively, Sikaiana is governed as an outlying region of Malaita Province in Solomon Islands. Sikaiana's population is approximately 300 people of Polynesian descent—not of the Melanesian descent prevalent in the main Solomon Islands. It is considered by anthropologists to be a Polynesian outlier.

A 1998 GAO report stated:

In 1893, the United Kingdom established the British Solomon Islands Protectorate over most of what is now Solomon Islands excluding Sikaiana. This was done to further British colonial interests in the region and to regulate the practice of ‘blackbirding’, the labour recruitment of Solomon Islanders to work on labour plantations in the then-colony of Queensland, later the state of Queensland.  On 21 June 1897 this protectorate was extended to include Sikaiana, Rennell, and Bellona Islands.

In religious terms, Sikaiana is part of the Anglican Church of Melanesia Diocese of Malaita, and the majority of its inhabitants are Anglicans.

See also
 Sikaiana language

Notes and references

Notes

References 
 Portions of the Book of Common Prayer in Sikaiana, 1932 Anglican liturgical document in Sikaiana.

External links

 Sikaiana
 Anglican History

Atolls of the Solomon Islands
Polynesian outliers
Territorial disputes of the United States
Hawaiian Kingdom